Haji Gayib's bathhouse – is an ancient fortress construction near a coastal side of Icheri Sheher.

Haji Gayib's bathhouse is located in Baku quarter of Icheri Sheher, opposite the Maiden Tower. History of the bathhouse is dated back to the 15th century.

Intake portal of the bathhouse is rectangular shaped. Whole complex of the bathhouse is divided into 3 groups: dressing room, changing room and a bathing area. The dressing and changing rooms have octagonal halls, surrounded by small rooms. Vaults and domes have various figured outlines and were implemented thoroughly. There is a pool with warm and cold water in the centre of the hall. Floors are covered with stone plates. Heating is promoted by ceramic pipes or channels under the floors of the rooms. Warm air, produced by water heating circulates along these channels.

References

Buildings and structures in Baku
Tourist attractions in Baku
Monuments and memorials in Azerbaijan
Icherisheher
Baths of Baku